Kadamba Simmons (7 May 1974 – 13/14 June 1998) was a British actress and model.

Career
Simmons appeared in advertisements for many products including Martini and Pantene shampoo. She had small roles in several films.

Filmography
The Good Sex Guide (1994)
Grim (1995) — Katie
Mary Reilly (1996) — Farraday Girl
Breeders (1997) — Space Girl
Cash in Hand (1998) — Shirley
It's Different for Girls (1998)
Merlin: The Return (2000) — as a memorial mention in the credits only
The Wonderland Experience (2002) — Jodie

Murder
By 1997, Simmons was tired of her hard partying lifestyle. She saw her previous life as shallow and unfulfilling. According to her family, she stopped going to nightclubs, began reading literature and watching classic films. In 1998, she went to India with her sister, Kumari, to find herself. While in Goa, she met 22-year-old Yaniv Malka, a near-penniless former Israeli soldier and she became infatuated with him. They moved in together a day after meeting. When Kumari returned to London, Malka and Simmons moved to Berlin where they worked on a fruit juice stall. However, the reality of life in the German capital, so different from the idyllic time on Goa, soon lost its lustre. In June 1998, Simmons returned to London alone. Malka rang her and threatened to kill himself unless she agreed to see him. On the night before they met, she told her father, John, "He's a loser. I don't want to end up with a loser. He cannot look after himself - how can he look after me?"

On 13 June 1998, Malka arrived in London and Simmons spent the day with him. They went to a flat in Islington, north London, borrowed from a friend. The next day, Simmons's naked body was discovered hanging in the shower. She had been strangled and then hanged by a leather strap in the bathroom. The rest of the flat was awash with blood. Later that day, police spent 90 minutes persuading Malka not to jump from the fifth floor ledge of a student hall of residence at University College, London. Taken into custody, he claimed her death was part of a joint suicide pact. He said that they had sex and then she begged him to strangle her. On 29 March 1999, Malka was sentenced to life imprisonment for the murder of Kadamba Simmons. He remained impassive as the judge passed sentence. Judge Elgan Edwards told Malka, "Kadamba Simmons had her whole life ahead of her. It was a life of great promise. You deprived her of that life. You caused suffering to her and great suffering to her family and friends." In February 2000, three Appeal Court judges unanimously rejected his claims that he had not received a fair trial.

References

External links
 

1974 births
Actresses from London
1998 deaths
English female models
English murder victims
People murdered in London
20th-century English actresses
Violence against women in London
Deaths by strangulation